Markus Reisner (born March 10, 1978, in Bucklige Welt, Lower Austria) is an Austrian historian, military expert, and officer of the Austrian Armed Forces serving as commander of the Gardebataillon.

Professional life

Training and first assignments 

Markus Reisner joined the Austrian Armed Forces in 1997 as a one-year volunteer and subsequently completed a preparatory semester for the Military Academy in Allentsteig.

From 1998 to 2002, he attended the Theresian Military Academy in Wiener Neustadt where he trained as an officer. He then served in the Reconnaissance Battalion 2 in Salzburg until 2004, where he was assigned as a platoon commander, deputy company commander, and training officer of an armored reconnaissance company. After that, he served with the Jagdkommando in Wiener Neustadt until 2013.

Studies and doctorate 

Reisner studied law and history at the University of Vienna. From 2010 to 2013, he completed doctoral studies in history at the University of Vienna (dissertation on the aerial warfare over Austria from 1943 to 1945, supervisor Lothar Höbelt). In 2017, he completed his Ph.D. studies at the Faculty of Law at the University of Vienna.

Service as a staff officer 

From 2014 to 2016, he completed the 20th General Staff Course at the National Defense Academy in Vienna. In June 2020, he was appointed head of the Development Department of the Theresian Military Academy, and led it with the rank of Colonel of the General Staff. Since September 1, 2022, Reisner is commander of the Gardebataillon, one of the most elite and traditional units of the Austrian Armed Forces, in Vienna.

Academic career 

Markus Reisner currently is a member of the Military History Advisory Board of the Scientific Commission at the Austrian Federal Ministry of Defense (since 2017), and holds a position as lecturer at the University of Applied Sciences Wiener Neustadt (since 2011). Before, he advised the Austrian Ministry of Foreign Affairs (2017-2018), as well as the Austrian Ministry of Defence (2018).

He has gained public recognition as head of the Development Department  of the Theresian Military Academy, where he delivered battlefield analyses in the form of YouTube videos on the 2022 Russian invasion of Ukraine. These videos had mainly been watched in the German sprachraum at first, but started to gather an international audience since being made available in English. Reisner is a speaker at the Candid Foundation, the University of Leeds, and the Austrian Institute for European and Security Policy.

Since 2000, Reisner has regularly published books and articles for German and English journals.

In 2023, he was appointed to the board of the Clausewitz Network for Strategic Studies.

Foreign deployments 

 2004–2013 in Bosnia and Herzegovina, Kosovo, Afghanistan, Chad, and the Central African Republic
 2019 as Austrian contingent commander in Mali
 2021 as Austrian contingent commander in Kosovo

Works

Monographs
 Robotic Wars. Legitimatorische Grundlagen und Grenzen des Einsatzes von Military Unmanned Systems in modernen Konfliktszenarien. Miles, Berlin 2018, .
 Die taktische Drohne. Zivile Fluggeräte als militärische Mittel. SPARTANAT, Klagenfurt 2022,  .

Editorship
 Hans Hoeller – D-Day Tank Hunter. The World War II Memoirs of a Frontline Officer from North Africa to the bloody Soil of Normandy. s.l. 2022, .

Articles
 Multinational Robotic Wars. The increasing Use of Unmanned Systems by State and Non-State-Actors in current and future Conflict Zones. Institut für Friedenssicherung und Konfliktmanagement (IFK), contribution to 2018 IFK anthology, Wien 2018.
 Current drone warfare in the light of the prohibition of interventions. University of Vienna Law Review. 2 (1): 69–94.
 Drones … the poor man´s Airforce. Truppendienst. 4/2019: 310–317.

Videos
 Heavy Weapons to Ukraine: Heavy Metal & Rock 'n' Roll. YouTube – Österreichs Bundesheer.
 Cognitive Warfare - The Fight for your Heart and Mind. YouTube – Österreichs Bundesheer.
 War for Ukraine - First Conclusions from 2022 and New Challenges 2023. YouTube – Österreichs Bundesheer.

References 

1978 births
Living people
Austrian historians
People from Lower Austria